Roberto Fregno (born 23 February 1959) is a retired Swiss football midfielder.

References

1959 births
Living people
Swiss men's footballers
FC Grenchen players
FC Locarno players
FC Wettingen players
FC Aarau players
FC St. Gallen players
AC Bellinzona players
FC Zürich players
FC Luzern players
Association football midfielders
Swiss Super League players
Sportspeople from the canton of Solothurn